Vajont is a valley in the area of Longarone, in the province of Pordenone, north-eastern Italy.

History
The municipality was founded in 1971 on the municipal territory of Maniago. It was built to rehome the people evacuated from Erto e Casso after the Vajont Dam disaster of 1963.

Language and dialect
In addition to the Italian language in the territory of Vajont, the dialects that are spoken are Ertano and Cassano, that come from villages of Erto and Casso. The Friulian language, typical only of the Friuli-Venezia Giulia region, is understood but not spoken.

Movie
Vajont – La diga del disonore (Vajont – The Dam of Dishonour), is a 2001 film directed by Renzo Martinelli. The film deals with the events that accompanied the construction of the dam and the 1963 Vajont disaster that cost the lives of about two thousand people.

External links

Cities and towns in Friuli-Venezia Giulia
Populated places established in 1971
1971 establishments in Italy